Prince Boworadej (2 April 1877 – 16 November 1953) was a Thai attempted-coup leader in 1933, so call Boworadet rebellion, government official, army, and royalty. After a defeat in the rebellion, he sought asylum in Cambodia, where he lived until 1948. He returned home to Thailand, and dying in 1953.

Early life
Mom Chao Boworadej Kridakorn born on 2 April 1877 in Bangkok. Boworadej was one of the grandsons of King Mongkut, a son of Prince Naret. Boworadej received his military education at the Harrow School in 1898, and the Royal Military Academy Woolwich in 1900. Boworadej moved back to Siam in 1900 to serve in Royal Thai Army's Command and General Staff Department.

Government official career
Boworadej was a career soldier who had served as an ambassador in Paris towards the end of King Chulalongkorn's reign from 1902 to 1905. He was "retired" in the latter part of King Vajiravudh's reign, but he was brought back into active service shortly after King Prajadhipok ascended the throne. Boworadej became the Royal Thai Army Chief of Staff in 1926. He took over the position as the Minister of Defence from Prince Boriphat who was promoted to Interior Minister in 1928. In 1929 the king honored Boworadej by raising him from Serene Highness to Royal Highness status.

Prince Boworadej had a fierce conflict with Prince Boriphat over the budget for the coming year in 1931. Prince Boworadej submitted his resignation to express his dissatisfaction. After some disputes by both sides, the resignation of Prince Boworadej was accepted by the Supreme Council of State and King Prajadhipok. The prince's relationship with other powerful princes soured after this crisis.

The Special Court's "Decision on the Insurrection" noted that Prince Boworadej had once consulted General Phahon and Phaya Srisith about the plan to change the government. Because of the prince's reluctance to use force to overthrow the government, the Promoters carried out the revolution without the prince's participation. He then expected Phahon to invite him to be prime minister. Pridi rejected Phahon's recommendation and named Phraya Manopakorn Nititada as prime minister instead of the prince. Boworadej was then at odds with the Promoters. An ardent royalist, he was furious that anyone was allowed to sue the king. This added to his displeasure at Phahon's coup in 1933 against Manopakorn and Phahon's support of Pridi against the monarch.

At the end of July 1933, Phibun and Supha sent a circular to a number of prominent individuals warning them to "exercise peace of mind", otherwise the "party will be forced to bring stringent measures to bear on you." A number of members of the royal house received the letter, including Prince Boworadej, who was in Hua Hin with the king at that time. The combined catalysts of the warning and Pridi's return stirred Prince Boworadej to seek revenge on the Promoters.

Rebellion leader 
In 1933, Prince Boworadej plotted with Colonel Phraya Sri Sitthi Songkhram (Thai: พระยาศรีสิทธิ์สงคราม), the commander of the military in Bangkok, to stage a coup d'état to unseat the Phahon government and replace it with a more traditional one.

Early in October 1933, Prince Boworadej appeared in Korat to mobilize the army to rebel. He soon took complete control of Korat and got positive responses from other provinces. On 11 October 1933, under the leadership of Boworadej, calling on the government to resign immediately or be removed by force on the same day, the government in Bangkok refused to comply with their demands. Government forces were defeated and several members of the government were captured. 

Boworadej tried to persuade other forces to join him, including the Royal Thai Navy, which instead declared itself neutral. The commander-in-chief of the navy withdrew his battleships from the capital and sailed to ports in the south. The People's Party put out radio broadcasts and leaflets damning the Boworadej forces as "rebels" and "bandits". In reply, the besiegers dropped leaflets on the city from airplanes, accusing the people's party of restraining King Prajadhipok.

Faced with the prospect of a full-scale battle to remove the existing leadership, Boworadej adopted a more conciliatory approach by entering into negotiations in which he called on the government to allow the king a greater political role. On 13 October, Boworadej sent another ultimatum to the government. The rebel leaders backed down from their original demand for the government to resign as troops in the provinces they counted on failed to march on Bangkok and all the units in Bangkok remained loyal to the government. 

By the end of October 1933, rebel remnants dispersed after Phibun commanded a counterattack in Bangkok, and the royalist rebellion was over. The government broadcast a radio appeal to rebel troops to surrender and offered a ten thousand baht reward for the capture of Boworadej.

On exile 
On 25 October Boworadej and his wife boarded an aeroplane and left Siam for Vietnam, then part of French Indochina. The People's Party arrested the stragglers and eventually jailed 230 people including Boworadej's younger brother, Prince Sinthiphorn Kadakorn. Boworadej sought asylum in Cambodia, where he lived until 1948. He then returned home to Thailand, received the army general rank, and dying in 1953 at the age of 76.

References

Citations

Sources 

1877 births
1953 deaths
19th-century Thai people
Thai male Phra Ong Chao
Kritakara family
Ministers of Defence of Thailand
Thai exiles
Thai expatriates in Cambodia
Refugees in Cambodia
Thai refugees
People educated at Harrow School
Graduates of the Royal Military Academy, Woolwich
19th-century Chakri dynasty
20th-century Chakri dynasty